Kevin Francis (born June 5, 1993) is a professional Canadian football linebacker for the Edmonton Elks of the Canadian Football League (CFL). He played as a tight end during his college football career with the North Carolina A&T Aggies.

Professional career

Saskatchewan Roughriders
After going undrafted in the 2016 NFL Draft, Francis declared eligible for the 2016 CFL Supplemental Draft after informing the league that he was born in Toronto, Ontario. He was drafted by the Roughriders on May 25, 2016, who forfeited a third round selection in the 2017 CFL Draft to acquire his rights. Upon entering 2016 training camp, Francis switched to the defensive side of the ball after previously playing on offence in college. He made his CFL debut on June 30, 2016 against the Toronto Argonauts, registering his first defensive tackle. He made his first career start at linebacker on October 22, 2016 against the Montreal Alouettes. Francis finished his rookie season having played in all 18 regular season games where he recorded 12 defensive tackles, 13 special teams tackles, and one forced fumble.

In 2017, Francis played in 15 regular season games where he had three defensive tackles, 10 special teams tackles, and one forced fumble. He suffered a shoulder injury in October and was on the injured list for the last three regular season games and both post-season games. To begin the 2018 season, he was placed on the injured list as he rehabbed his injury from 2017. He then played in the remaining 12 games of the regular season where he had six special teams tackles. He also made his post-season debut where he played in the West Final loss to the Winnipeg Blue Bombers. He became a free agent in 2019.

Ottawa Redblacks
On February 14, 2019, Francis signed with the Ottawa Redblacks to a one-year contract. He played in just seven regular season games, but recorded eight special teams tackles.

BC Lions
Francis again entered free agency and signed a one-year deal with the BC Lions on February 11, 2020. However, the 2020 CFL season was cancelled and Francis never played for the Lions.

Saskatchewan Roughriders (II)
On February 12, 2021, it was announced that Francis had re-signed with the Saskatchewan Roughriders.

BC Lions (II)
Francis signed again with the BC Lions on February 9, 2022.

Edmonton Elks
Francis joined the Edmonton Elks as a free agent on February 14, 2023.

References

External links 
 BC Lions bio

1993 births
Living people
American football tight ends
American players of Canadian football
BC Lions players
Canadian football linebackers
North Carolina A&T Aggies football players
Ottawa Redblacks players
Canadian football people from Toronto
Saskatchewan Roughriders players